The 2014–15 season was Unione Calcio Sampdoria's second season back in Serie A after having been relegated at the end of the 2011–12 season. The team competed in Serie A, finishing seventh and qualifying for the 2015–16 UEFA Europa League, and the Coppa Italia, finishing in the Round of 16.

Players

Squad information
.

Competitions

Serie A

League table

Results summary

Results by round

Matches

Coppa Italia

Statistics

Appearances and goals

|-
! colspan="10" style="background:#dcdcdc; text-align:center"| Goalkeepers

|-
! colspan="10" style="background:#dcdcdc; text-align:center"| Defenders

|-
! colspan="10" style="background:#dcdcdc; text-align:center"| Midfielders

|-
! colspan="10" style="background:#dcdcdc; text-align:center"| Forwards

|-
! colspan="10" style="background:#dcdcdc; text-align:center"| Players transferred out during the season

References

U.C. Sampdoria seasons
Sampdoria